Acraea endoscota, the Le Doux's glassy acraea, is a butterfly in the family Nymphalidae. It is found in Guinea, Sierra Leone, Ivory Coast, Ghana, Nigeria, Cameroon, Gabon, the Republic of the Congo, the Central African Republic, northern Angola, the Democratic Republic of the Congo (Mongala, Kivu, Kasai, Sankuru), Uganda, Rwanda, south-western Ethiopia, western Kenya and western Tanzania.

Biology
The habitat consists of forests.

Adults are attracted to flowers.

The larvae feed on Rinorea breviracemosa.

Taxonomy
It is a member of the Acraea  terpsicore   species group   -   but see also Pierre & Bernaud, 2014

References

External links

Acraea endoscota Le Site des Acraea de Dominique Bernaud
Acraea endoscota Image collection Dominique Bernaud

Butterflies described in 1928
endoscota